Edward Poulton may refer to:
 Edward Bagnall Poulton, British evolutionary biologist
 Edward L. Poulton, British trade unionist
 Edward Palmer Poulton, English physician and physiologist